Highfin shiner (Notropis altipinnis) is a species of ray-finned fish in the genus Notropis. It is endemic to the United States, where it is found in the lower Roanoke River drainage from southeastern Virginia, south in Piedmont and Coastal Plain areas to the middle Savannah River drainage in South Carolina.

References 

 

Notropis
Fish described in 1870